= Airdlin =

- Location within Gauteng Location within South Africa
- Coordinates: 26.0329°S 28.0638°E
- Country: South Africa
- Province: Gauteng
- Municipality: City of Johannesburg

Area
  - Total: 1.18 km^{2} (0.46 sq mi)

Population (2001)
  - Total: 278
  - Density: 236/km^{2} (610/sq mi)
- Time zone: UTC+2 (SAST)
- PO box: 2157

Airdlin is a suburb in the north of Sandton in the Gauteng province of South Africa.
